Microlechia rhamnifoliae is a moth in the family Gelechiidae. It was described by Hans Georg Amsel and Erich Martin Hering in 1931. It is found on the Canary Islands and Cyprus, as well as in Morocco, Greece, Israel, Palestine, Saudi Arabia, Namibia and South Africa.

References

Microlechia
Moths described in 1931